Salomón Torres Ramirez (born March 11, 1972) is a Dominican former professional baseball player.

Career

San Francisco Giants
Torres is best known for starting the last game of the 1993 season for the Giants, when he gave up three runs over  innings to the arch-rival Los Angeles Dodgers. The Giants, winners of 103 games that season, finished in second place behind the 104-win Atlanta Braves, at that time in the National League West division. Though he was then in his first month as a Major Leaguer, some Giants fans blamed Torres for ruining a promising season and apparently never forgave him; those fans continued to heckle him when he returned to San Francisco as an opposing player. Said Torres: "They come to the park and they pay my salary, so they have the right to heckle me. If that's going to make them feel better and get over what happened in 1993, OK. But it's time to move on.... I don't think I was treated fairly by some of my teammates. And I still don't think I'm being treated fairly by the fans."

Mariners and Expos and first retirement
The Giants traded Torres to the Seattle Mariners in mid-1995 for Shawn Estes and Wilson Delgado.  After two years with the Mariners, he was claimed off waivers by the Montreal Expos in mid-1997.  After ending the  season with a 9.82 ERA, Torres retired and returned to the Dominican Republic to coach for the Expos' Dominican Summer League team.

Comeback with Pirates
In , Torres decided to make a comeback, and spent the year playing in the Dominican Winter League and in South Korea. He signed with the Pittsburgh Pirates in January , spending most of the year with the Triple-A team in Nashville before being called up in September. On April 20, 2003, Torres hit Chicago Cubs right fielder Sammy Sosa in the head with an errant fastball that shattered his helmet. 

That year, his 94 pitching appearances led the major leagues and tied the Pirates record held by Kent Tekulve. González was traded to the Atlanta Braves before the start of the  season, making Torres the Pirates' top choice for closer entering the 2007 season. After blowing four saves for the Pirates, he was demoted from the closer role and replaced with Matt Capps.

Milwaukee Brewers
Torres was traded to the Milwaukee Brewers on December 7, 2007, for Kevin Roberts and Marino Salas. After beginning the  season as a middle reliever, Torres was moved into the closer's role when Éric Gagné was put on the disabled list, a role Torres kept for the rest of the year. Torres struggled mightily towards the end of the season, however. On September 18, Torres blew a 4-run lead to the Chicago Cubs, giving up 4 runs with two outs and nobody on in the bottom of the 9th. He posted an ERA over 8.00 in the month of September.

His season, though, was relatively solid: 28 saves in 35 chances, 51 strikeouts in 80 innings of work, an ERA of 3.41, and a record of 7-5. During his time in Milwaukee, he introduced a new strike-out pitch in which he dropped down to a side-arm delivery.

During the middle of the 2008 season, Torres stated in an interview that he wasn't sure about his future in baseball, and on November 11 Torres told Brewers GM Doug Melvin that he was retiring from the game.

Personal life
Torres is a Jehovah's Witness. He is married to Belkis Denia Donato and has two daughters and a son; Ashley (20), Allison (18), and Jordan (13).

References

External links

1972 births
Living people
Clinton Giants players
Dominican Republic expatriate baseball players in Canada
Dominican Republic expatriate baseball players in South Korea
Dominican Republic expatriate baseball players in the United States
Dominican Republic Jehovah's Witnesses
Gulf Coast Pirates players
Indianapolis Indians players
KBO League pitchers

Major League Baseball pitchers
Major League Baseball players from the Dominican Republic
Milwaukee Brewers players
Montreal Expos players
Nashville Sounds players
Ottawa Lynx players
Sportspeople from San Pedro de Macorís
Phoenix Firebirds players
Pittsburgh Pirates players
Samsung Lions players
San Francisco Giants players
Seattle Mariners players
Shreveport Captains players
Tacoma Rainiers players
World Baseball Classic players of the Dominican Republic
2006 World Baseball Classic players